Daning River, is a river in the Chinese municipality of Chongqing.

References

Rivers of Chongqing